Michael Joseph Pelyk (born September 29, 1947) is a Canadian former professional ice hockey player who played 441 games in the National Hockey League (NHL) and 150 games in the World Hockey Association (WHA) between 1967 and 1978. He played with the Toronto Maple Leafs, Vancouver Blazers, and Cincinnati Stingers.

Playing career
Pelyk attended Michael Power St. Joseph High School in Etobicoke, Ontario. Although a gifted skater, Pelyk struggled with inconsistency early in his NHL career with the Toronto Maple Leafs. In the 1973–74 season he seemed to be finally reaching his potential, leading Leaf defensemen with 12 goals, when he was lured away from the Leafs with a million-dollar contact to the Vancouver Blazers of the WHA. However, he was never quite able to return to the potential shown in the 1973–74 season either in his two years in the WHA, or with his return to the NHL with the Maple Leafs in 1976. After two years alternating between the NHL and CHL he retired in 1978.

Mike Pelyk was captain of the WHA Cincinnati Stingers for the 1975–76 season.

Career statistics

Regular season and playoffs

References

External links 
 

1947 births
Living people
Canadian ice hockey defencemen
Cincinnati Stingers players
Dallas Black Hawks players
Ice hockey people from Toronto
Sportspeople from Etobicoke
Toronto Maple Leafs draft picks
Toronto Maple Leafs players
Toronto Marlboros players
Tulsa Oilers (1964–1984) players
Vancouver Blazers players